Mads Pedersen (born 17 January 1993) is a Danish footballer who last played for Sandefjord. He is in the team since 2011 and plays as a central midfielder.

References

External links

Mads Pedersen træner med i Vejle, bold.dk, 6 January 2016

1993 births
Living people
Danish men's footballers
FC Midtjylland players
Skive IK players
Lyngby Boldklub players
Sandefjord Fotball players
Danish Superliga players
Eliteserien players
Danish expatriate men's footballers
Danish expatriate sportspeople in Norway
Expatriate footballers in Norway
Association football midfielders
People from Nakskov